(1 May 1899 – 15 July 2002), was a Japanese architectural historian. His son, Yukihiko Fujishima, is a lecturer at Waseda University.

Early life and education
He was born in Morioka, Iwate Prefecture, in 1899. He graduated from the Graduate School of Engineering at the University of Tokyo in 1920.
He became an associate professor at the University of Tokyo in 1929, and professor in 1933. He designed the Kurihara Ruins in Tokyo in 1957. He retired in 1960, and became Professor Emeritus of the University of Tokyo.

Books
 A history of Korean art, published in "Architectural Magazine" edition  530-536 (1930)
 Taiwanese Architecture (1948)
 Japanese Architecture (1958)

References 
 WorldCat.org

External links
 Kotobank.jp

People from Iwate Prefecture